Several surveys of academics and the general public have been conducted to evaluate and rank the performance of the prime ministers of Australia.

According to Paul Strangio of Monash University, there has been little academic interest in ranking Australian prime ministers, unlike the numerous surveys conducted on American presidents and British prime ministers. The few surveys that have been conducted have been quite unscientific, with respondents chosen at random and no efforts made to measure personal biases. Strangio notes that "the dominant methodology for studying the nation's leaders has been individual-centered biographies [...] the relatively small number of collective anthologies have treated each prime minister discretely rather than undertaking comparative analysis of their leadership performance, let alone contemplating qualities of greatness in the office".

Surveys of historians

The Canberra Times (1992)
In 1992, The Canberra Times asked "almost 300 political scientists and historians at every Australian university" to nominate the five greatest prime ministers in Australian history; 143 responded. Five points were awarded to the prime minister each respondent judged to be the greatest, and so on down to one point for the fifth-greatest prime minister; some respondents awarded half points. Ben Chifley received the most overall points in the survey (and was judged to be the overall winner), although Alfred Deakin was nominated as the greatest prime minister by the most respondents. The four shortest-serving prime ministers were excluded from consideration, as well as the serving prime minister, Paul Keating. The total number of points was not published for prime ministers ranked outside the ten (except for those who received no points), only the order.

The Australian Financial Review (2001)
In 2001, to commemorate the centenary of federation, The Australian Financial Review asked six historians to answer the question "who were the best five and who were the worst five prime ministers since 1901?". Five points were awarded to each historian's choice as the best and worst prime minister, and so on down to one point for the fifth-best and fifth-worst prime ministers. Alfred Deakin was a unanimous choice as Australia's best prime minister, winning full votes from each selector; Robert Menzies also appeared on every "best" list. No one prime minister appeared on all six "worst" lists, although William McMahon appeared on five and James Scullin on four. Several prime ministers appeared on both "best" and "worst" lists, sometimes from the same selector. Stuart Macintyre considered Menzies to be Australia's second-best prime minister for his 1949–66 term, but also the fifth-worst, for his 1939–41 term. Likewise, Humphrey McQueen considered Gough Whitlam to be both the fifth-best and the fourth-worst, describing him as a "curate's egg". Macintyre was the only respondent to award half-points, ranking Whitlam and Paul Keating as the equal fifth-best prime ministers. The three caretaker prime ministers were excluded from consideration, as well as the serving prime minister, John Howard.

The participants in the survey were Geoffrey Bolton (ECU), Graeme Davison (Monash), Ian Hancock (ANU), Stuart Macintyre (Melbourne), Humphrey McQueen (freelance), and Clem Lloyd (Wollongong). Geoffrey Blainey was invited to participate, but declined.

The Age (2004)
In 2004, The Age asked fifteen historians and political commentators to rank Australia's eleven prime ministers from John Curtin onwards (i.e., since 1941). Eleven points were awarded to the prime minister each respondent judged to be the greatest, and so on down to one point for the worst prime minister; some respondents awarded half points. John Curtin received the most overall points in the survey, as well as being named the greatest prime minister by the most respondents (exactly one-third of the total). William McMahon received the lowest possible ranking from all but one respondent. The two caretaker prime ministers during that time were excluded from consideration, but the serving prime minister, John Howard, was included.

The participants in the survey were Judith Brett (La Trobe), Greg Craven (Curtin), David Day (La Trobe), Michael Duffy (freelance), Brian Galligan (Melbourne), Ian Hancock (ANU), John Hirst (La Trobe), Carol Johnson (Adelaide), Stuart Macintyre (Melbourne), Alistair Mant (freelance), Andrew Parkin (Flinders), Tom Stannage (Curtin), Paul Strangio (Monash), James Walter (Monash), and Patrick Weller (Griffith). Geoffrey Blainey, Marian Simms, and several others were invited to participate, but declined.

Monash University (2010)
In 2010, a team of researchers from Monash University asked "145 academics that were teaching or researching in the fields of Australian politics or history" to place Australia's prime ministers in five categories; 40 responded. Five points were awarded to prime ministers judged "outstanding", four for those considered "good", three for "average", two for "below average", and one for "failure". The three caretaker prime ministers —Earle Page, Frank Forde, and John McEwen— were excluded from consideration, as was the then–serving prime minister, Julia Gillard. John Curtin received the highest average rating, 4.78, and he was the only prime minister to whom no respondents gave a rating lower than "good".

Monash University (2020)
In 2020, researchers from Monash University replicated the 2010 survey, and asked 121 "scholars working in the fields of Australian politics/history" to place Australia's prime ministers in five categories; 66 participated. As with the previous survey, five points were awarded to prime ministers judged "outstanding", four for those considered "good", three for "average", two for "below average", and one for "failure". New additions to the survey included Julia Gillard, the second tenure of Kevin Rudd, Tony Abbott, and Malcolm Turnbull. The three caretaker prime ministers were excluded from consideration, as was the then–serving prime minister, Scott Morrison. Arthur Fadden, who was prime minister for four months and was present in the 2010 survey, was omitted from this survey. Of the 22 prime ministers ranked on both surveys, only four improved their standings (Keating, Watson, Reid, and Scullin) from 2010.

Rankings by highest approval rating
It is possible to compare the highest approval ratings achieved by prime ministers in various opinion polls.

Nielsen Poll

According to the Nielsen Poll (available since 1972), Bob Hawke had the highest approval rating in November 1984, with 75%, and the lowest was William McMahon, with a 34% approval rating.

Highest Nielsen Poll ratings for each prime minister since 1972:

Bob Hawke – 75% (November 1984)
Kevin Rudd – 74% (March 2009)
John Howard – 67% (January 2005)
Gough Whitlam – 62% (February 1973) 
Malcolm Fraser – 56% (April 1976 and May 1978) 
Julia Gillard – 56% (July 2010) 
Tony Abbott – 47% (November 2013)
Paul Keating – 40% (November 1994)
William McMahon – 34% (November 1972)

William McMahon ended 1971 with an approval rating of 36.4%. By the end of 1972, his popularity had sunk to 34%, and he was defeated by Gough Whitlam in the 1972 election.

Newspoll

Highest satisfaction rating
According to Newspoll (available since 1985), the highest satisfaction rating of any prime minister was Kevin Rudd's at 71% in August 2008, while Paul Keating has had the lowest high-mark satisfaction rating at 43%.

Voters are asked the question: 'Are you satisfied or dissatisfied with the way -name- is doing his/her job as Prime Minister?'

Kevin Rudd – 71% (18–20 April 2008)
Scott Morrison - 68% (22–25 April 2020)
John Howard – 67% (10–12 May 1996)
Bob Hawke – 62% (24–26 January 1987)   
Anthony Albanese – 61% (27–30 July 2022)
Malcolm Turnbull – 60% (19–22 November 2015)
Julia Gillard – 50% (18–20 February 2011) 
Tony Abbott – 47% (25–27 October 2013) 
Paul Keating – 43% (2–18 April 1993, 16–18 September 1994 & 18–20 November 1994)

Lowest satisfaction rating

Since Newspoll began in 1985, the lowest satisfaction rating of any prime minister is by far Paul Keating's at 17% in August 1993, with a 6% difference between Keating and the nearest low rating of Julia Gillard at 23% in September 2011.

Paul Keating – 17% (20–22 August 1993) 
Julia Gillard – 23% (2–4 September 2011)
Tony Abbott – 24% (6–8 February 2015)
Bob Hawke – 27% (29 November - 8 December 1991) 
John Howard – 28% (26–29 June 1998 & 9–11 March 2001)  
Malcolm Turnbull – 29% (20–23 October 2016 & 23–26 February 2017)
Kevin Rudd – 32% (30 August - 1 September 2013)
Scott Morrison – 37% (8–11 January 2020)

Public opinion polls

JWS research
In May 2011, John Scales of JWS research polled 2141 people in the 10 most marginal Labor seats and the 10 most marginal Coalition seats.

Asked "which, of the past five, had been the best government for Australia ?", responses were as follows:

50 per cent nominated the Howard government (1996-2007)
13 per cent for the Keating government (1991-1996)
13 per cent for the Hawke government (1983-1991)
12 per cent for the Rudd government (2007-2010)
4 per cent nominated the Gillard government (2010-2013)
8 per cent responded as "unsure"

In all, 50 per cent of all respondents nominated a Liberal Party government, with 42 per cent nominating the Labor Party. At the time of the survey, the federal government was led by the Labor Party.

See also
 Historical rankings of prime ministers of Canada
 Historical rankings of prime ministers of the United Kingdom
 Historical rankings of presidents of the United States
 Historical rankings of prime ministers of the Netherlands
 Historical rankings of chancellors of Germany

References

Further reading
 Strangio, Paul. Evaluating prime-ministerial performance: The Australian experience (Oxford University Press, 2013) online.
 Strangio, Paul. "Prime-ministerial leadership rankings: the Australian experience." Australian Journal of Political Science (2022): 1-19.
 Strangio, Paul, Paul'T. Hart, and James Walter. Settling the Office: The Australian Prime Ministership from Federation to Reconstruction (Melbourne Univ. Publishing, 2016).
 Strangio, Paul, Paul'T. Hart, and James Walter. The pivot of power: Australian prime ministers and political leadership, 1949-2016 (Melbourne Univ. Publishing, 2017).

External links
 Australia's prime ministers

Historical ranking
Australia